John Whalen may refer to:
 John Sibley Whalen, Secretary of State of New York
 John Whalen (horse trainer)